François Gaudreau (born February 17, 1957 in Montreal, Quebec) is a Canadian politician and was the Action démocratique du Québec Member of the National Assembly for the electoral district of Vimont from 2002 to 2003.

Gaudreau was first elected to the National Assembly in a by-election, held on June 17, 2002, with 50% of the vote. Liberal candidate Vincent Auclair finished second with 33% of the vote.

In the 2003 election, Gaudreau finished third with 19% of the vote.  Auclair won, with 46% of the vote.

In the 2007 election, Gaudreau attempted to win the seat back from Auclair.  He finished second with 31% of the vote.  Auclair won with 36% of the vote.

He was the candidate for the CAQ in Sainte-Rose in the 2012 election.

Electoral record (partial)

External links

References

1957 births
Action démocratique du Québec MNAs
Living people
Politicians from Montreal
21st-century Canadian politicians